Volodarsky District is the name of several administrative and municipal districts in Russia. The districts are generally named after V. Volodarsky, a Russian revolutionary and politician.

Districts of the federal subjects
Volodarsky District, Astrakhan Oblast, an administrative and municipal district of Astrakhan Oblast
Volodarsky District, Nizhny Novgorod Oblast, an administrative and municipal district of Nizhny Novgorod Oblast

City divisions
Volodarsky City District, a city district of Bryansk, the administrative center of Bryansk Oblast

See also
Volodarsky (disambiguation)
Volodarsk (disambiguation)

References